FACC may refer to:

 Fanconi anemia, complementation group C, a protein that delays the onset of apoptosis and promotes homologous recombination repair of damaged DNA
 Fellow of the American College of Cardiology
 Ford Aerospace Corporation, 1976-1988 named Ford Aerospace and Communications Corporation
 , an Austrian aircraft components manufacturer